The 2022 LPGA of Korea Tour was the 45th season of the LPGA of Korea Tour, the professional golf tour for women operated by the Korea Ladies Professional Golf' Association.

Schedule
Below is the schedule for the 2022 season. "Date" is the ending date for the tournament. The number in parentheses after winners' names show the player's total number wins in official money individual events on the LPGA of Korea Tour, including that event.

Events in bold are majors.

References

External links
 

2022
2022 in women's golf
2022 in South Korean sport